The South Bismarck Plate is a small tectonic plate located in the southern Bismarck Sea. The eastern part of New Guinea and the island of New Britain are on this plate.

Tectonics
Convergent boundaries line the southern border including the subduction zone responsible for the formation of New Britain and the Solomon Islands.   Many earthquakes occur in this area particularly around New Britain.  GPS data shows the South Bismarck plate, though north of the Australian plate boundary, is being pushed by Australia in a northerly direction while the North Bismarck Plate is being dragged by the Pacific plate easterly.  The line delineating the two is called the Bismarck Seismic Sea Lineation (BSSL), and it is not known where this line ends on the West side towards New Ireland.

See also
List of earthquakes in Papua New Guinea

References

Sources

Bird, P. (2003) An updated digital model of plate boundaries, Geochemistry, Geophysics, Geosystems, 4(3), 1027, . 

Tectonic plates
Geology of the Pacific Ocean